The 2008 World Outdoor Bowls Championship women's fours was held at the Burnside Bowling Club in Christchurch, New Zealand, from 12 to 24 January 2008.

Lynsey Armitage, Claire Duke, Julie Keegan and Karen Murphy won the women's fours gold medal.

Section tables

Section A

Section B

Finals

Results

References

Bowls
Wom
World